Satriano may refer to:

Places 
 Ascoli Satriano
 Satriano (Calabria)
 Satriano di Lucania
 its Roman predecessor Satrianum
 the former Roman Catholic Diocese of Satriano, with see in the above, which is now a Latin Catholic titular see under the Ancient name Satrianum

People 
 Martín Satriano, Uruguayan footballer